Jan (or John) Ingenhousz or Ingen-Housz FRS (8 December 1730 – 7 September 1799) was a Dutch-born British physiologist, biologist and chemist.

He is best known for discovering photosynthesis by showing that light is essential to the process by which green plants absorb carbon dioxide and release oxygen. He also discovered that plants, like animals, have cellular respiration. In his lifetime he was known for successfully inoculating the members of the Habsburg family in Vienna against smallpox in 1768 and subsequently being the private counsellor and personal physician to the Austrian Empress Maria Theresa.

Early life 
He was born into the patrician Ingen Housz family in Breda in Staats-Brabant in the Dutch Republic. From the age of 16, Ingenhousz studied medicine at the University of Leuven, the Protestant Universities were not then open to Catholics like himself, where he obtained his MD in 1753. He studied two more years at the University of Leiden, where he attended lectures by, among others, Pieter van Musschenbroek, which led Ingenhousz to have a lifelong interest in electricity. In 1755 he returned home to Breda, where he started a general medical practice.

Work with smallpox 
Following his father's death in July 1764, Ingenhousz intended to travel through Europe for study, starting in England where he wanted to learn the latest techniques in inoculation against smallpox. Via the physician John Pringle, who had been a family friend since the 1740s, he quickly made many valuable contacts in London, and in due time became a master inoculator. In 1767, he inoculated 700 village people in a successful effort to combat an epidemic in Hertfordshire. In 1768, Empress Maria Theresa read a letter by Pringle on the success in the fight against smallpox in England, whereas in the Austrian Empire the medical establishment vehemently opposed inoculations. She decided to have her own family inoculated first (a cousin had already died), and requested help via the English royal house. On Pringle's recommendation, Ingenhousz was selected and requested to travel to Austria. He had planned to inoculate the Royal Family by pricking them with a needle and thread that were coated with smallpox germs taken from the pus of a smallpox-infected person. The idea of the inoculation was that by giving a few germs to a healthy body the body would develop immunisation from smallpox. The inoculation was a success and he became Maria Theresa's court physician. He settled in Vienna, where in 1775 he married Agatha Maria Jacquin.

Work with photosynthesis 
In the 1770s Ingenhousz became interested in gaseous exchanges of plants.  He did this after meeting the scientist Joseph Priestley (1733–1804) at his house in Birstall, West Yorkshire, on 23 May 1771. Priestley had found out that plants make and absorb gases. Ingenhousz' travelling party in northern England included Benjamin Franklin. They then stayed at the rectory in Thornhill, West Yorkshire with the polymath and botanist Rev. John Michell. In 1779, Ingenhousz discovered that, in the presence of light, plants give off bubbles from their green parts while, in the shade, the bubbles eventually stop. He identified the gas as oxygen. He also discovered that, in the dark, plants give off carbon dioxide. He realised as well that the amount of oxygen given off in the light is more than the amount of carbon dioxide given off in the dark. This demonstrated that some of the mass of plants comes from the air, and not only the water and nutrients in the soil.

Other work 

In addition to his work in the Netherlands and Vienna, Ingenhousz spent time in France, England, Scotland, and Switzerland, among other places.  He carried out research in electricity, heat conduction, and chemistry, and was in close and frequent correspondence with both Benjamin Franklin and Henry Cavendish. In 1785, he described the irregular movement of coal dust on the surface of alcohol and therefore has a claim as discoverer of what came to be known as Brownian motion.  Ingenhousz was elected a Fellow of the Royal Society of London in 1769 and a member of the American Philosophical Society in 1786.
In 1799, Ingenhousz died at Bowood House, near Calne in Wiltshire, and was buried in the churchyard of St Mary the Virgin, Calne. His wife died the following year.

Tribute 
On 8 December 2017, Google Doodle commemorated his 287th birthday.

References

Further reading 
 Norman and Elaine Beale, Echoes of Ingen Housz. The long lost story of the genius who rescued the Habsburgs from smallpox and became the father of photosynthesis. 630 pages, with a foreword by David Bellamy, Hobnob Press, July 2011, .
 Geerdt Magiels, From sunlight to insight. Jan IngenHousz, the discovery of photosynthesis & science in the light of ecology. VUB Press, 2009, .

External links 

 Experiments upon Vegetables, Discovering their Great Power of Purifying the Common Air in the Sun-shine, and of Injuring it in the Shade and at Night (London, 1779)
 Entry at the Catholic Encyclopedia
 Ingenhousz's relationship to Brownian motion, see page 1
 Best known for Discovering Photosynthesis

1730 births
1799 deaths
18th-century Dutch physicians
Court physicians
18th-century Dutch botanists
Dutch physiologists
Fellows of the Royal Society
Leiden University alumni
People from Breda
Researchers of photosynthesis
Smallpox
Old University of Leuven alumni
Dutch Catholics
Members of the American Philosophical Society